A list of films produced in Argentina in 1970:

External links and references
 Argentine films of 1970 at the Internet Movie Database

1970
Films
Argentine